Ladda Land is a 2011 Thai horror film directed and co-written by Sophon Sakdaphisit. The film is based on a story about a family who moves into a new house where they gradually begin to encounter paranormal events. The film was very successful in Thailand where it was the number one film in the country on its opening week. The film later had its international premiere at the 17th Busan International Film Festival. The film won six awards at the Thailand National Film Association Awards.

Plot
Thee, a struggling 40-year-old marketing officer, moves from Bangkok to Laddaland, an upmarket housing estate located in Chiang Mai, bringing along his wife, Parn, his rebellious teenage daughter, Nan, and lively young son, Nat. Thee is certain that the move is the best option to answer all of his financial problems relating to the company he works for, which sells dietary supplements, despite his wife's concern over the hefty mortgage payments required to purchase the new house.

Thee also hopes to mend his relationship with Nan, who is resentful of her parents due to spending much of her life with her maternal grandmother as per an agreement between Thee and Parn's mother — Nan was born out of wedlock when her parents were still in high school, and Parn's mother, who never accepts Parn's relationship with Thee, demands Nan in return for their continued relationship. Nan is unimpressed despite Thee's best efforts to make good of the situation and wishes to return to her grandmother.

While Laddaland appears to be a relatively ordinary, if quiet, neighborhood, Thee and his family realize that something is wrong with the environs, since the place seems to sow discord on the families to commit violence. A Burmese housemaid is found dead in a grisly murder. Somkiat, Thee's next-door neighbor, regularly beats his wife and son while mistreating his elderly mother; the entirety of the family eventually perish when Somkiat commits murder suicide, with his son's death being the most horrific as he disfigures his face by vertically cutting it. Meanwhile, Nan experiences supernatural phenomena when she is swayed by her friends to visit the house where the Burmese maid was killed, but Thee's inability to believe them causes her to move to her boarding school until the end of her term. 

Thee and Parn also eventually succumb to the discord, Thee because of his discovery that his company is a fraud and his boss is taking away all of his money, forcing him to work in odd jobs such as being a shop clerk, and Parn because of the stress of Nan's absence and her own supernatural experiences. Nat is the only one who remains uncorrupted from the violence and is happy to live there, but his friendship with an imaginary friend that turns out to be Somkiat's deceased son only worries Parn even further.

The dysfunction reaches its nadir when Nan, on the day of her return from boarding school, is haunted by the spirit of Somkiat's wife and mother next door and has to stay at a mental hospital so she can be calmed down. Parn lashes out at Thee and says that she and the children will move back to her mother. Thee discovers Nat missing that night and searches Somkiat's house, where he is haunted by the spirit of Somkiat's son. He is followed by Parn, who finds Thee shooting at a wardrobe where Nat is hiding in his hide-and-seek game with Somkiat's son. Nat survives the shot, but Thee, thinking that he had killed his son, commits suicide.

Parn drives her children back to her mother in Bangkok after the tragedy. She recounts to Nan of how she became accustomed to Thee, how she lost her dreams when she discovered her pregnancy, and how in spite of everything, Thee always tries to do his best and love his family. The film ends with flashbacks showing Thee and his family in happier times.

Release
Ladda Land was released in Thailand on April 28, 2011. The film received an international premiere at the 17th Busan International Film Festival on October 11, 2011.

Laddaland was a big hit in Thailand where it premiered at number one in its first week, beating out the American film Thor. The film was shown for six weeks in Thailand where it grossed a total of $3,877,740. The Hollywood Reporter suggested in their review that the film was such a big hit in Thailand due to circumstances in the film being based on an actual condo development in Chiang Mai that is rumoured to be haunted.

Reception
Variety gave the Laddaland as positive review referring to it as "tasty T-horror" and that it was a "well-made chiller is ideal for fest sidebars, and should reap strong worldwide ancillary." The Hollywood Reporter gave a positive review, referring to the film as "sleekly designed" but that "some of the CGI are rough round the edges". The reviewer felt that Laddaland was also inferior compared to the Thai horror films Shutter (2004) and Alone (2007). Film Business Asia echoed The Hollywood Reporter'''s sentiments gave the film the a 6 out of 10 rating, and stating that it was a "technically effective horror movie" but one that "leaves the audience short-changed on a story level."Laddaland'' won six awards at the Thailand National Film Association Awards. These awards included Best Film, Best Actress (Piyathida Woramusik), Best Supporting Actress (Sutatta Udomsilp), Best Screenplay (Sopana Chaowwiwatkul and Sophon Sakdaphisit), Best Editing (Nagamon Boonrod, Phuriphan Phuphaibun, Thammarat Sumetsupachok) and best make-up (Pichet Wongjansom).

Notes

External links

Thai horror films
2011 horror films
GMM Tai Hub films
Thai supernatural horror films
2011 films
Best Picture Suphannahong National Film Award winners